A. Hays Town (June 17, 1903 – January 6, 2005) was an American architect whose career spanned over sixty-five years. While Town designed commercial and governmental buildings in the style of modern architecture for the first forty years of his career, he became best known for his residential architecture, which was heavily influenced by the Spanish, French, and Creole history of Louisiana. His work was featured in several publications during his lifetime, including Time, Life, Southern Living, and Southern Accents. Today, there are an estimated 1,000 homes remaining that were designed and built by Town, and his distinct style continues to exert an influence on modern southern architecture.

Early life
Town was born June 17, 1903, in Crowley, Louisiana, the second son of Joshua Hays and Mary Laboye Town. When Town was in the third grade, his family moved to Lafayette, Louisiana, where his father owned and operated a general merchandise store. From an early age Town showed an artistic proclivity and was encouraged by his father to draw buildings as a form of self-expression. At the age of fourteen, Town designed his first piece of architecture, a remodeling plan for the family home.

Town attended high school in Lafayette at Southwestern Louisiana Institute High School, finishing in 1920. From 1920 to 1922 he was enrolled in the College of Engineering at Southwestern Louisiana Institute, now the University of Louisiana at Lafayette. In 1922, he entered the School of Architecture at Tulane University in New Orleans, graduating in 1926 with a Bachelor of Science degree in architecture.

Architecture career

Commercial architecture
Upon obtaining his degree in 1926, Town moved to Jackson, Mississippi where he was employed by architect Noah Webster Overstreet. The following year, Town married Blanche Scarff of Abbeville, Louisiana; they would remain together until her death in 1980. Town was soon recognized as one of the most outstanding young modernists in American architecture, and Life featured on its cover one of his designs—a monolithic concrete building in Jackson that houses Bailey Magnet High School. The school, built in 1938, was recently voted a top architectural site by the state chapter of the American Institute of Architects.

While with Overstreet, Town had the opportunity to survey many of the Antebellum homes in the state of Mississippi. During this time, Town studied the measurements of Antebellum architecture, which helped to refine his sense of symmetry and proportion in domestic architecture. Additionally, Town became interested in the use of recycled building materials, a feature of his houses that would become a hallmark of his architecture during his later years.

In 1939, Town returned to Louisiana, this time settling in Baton Rouge, where he established his own architectural firm. For the next two decades, Town worked as an independent practitioner, designing office buildings, churches, and shopping centers; however, by the early 1960s, at an age when most people consider retirement, Town converted his practice to purely domestic architecture.

Domestic architecture

Town's earlier homes borrowed from American colonial architecture and Georgian architecture influences. As his career progressed he began developing his own style influenced heavily by Spanish and French architecture. Interior courtyards and fountains reflect the Spanish tradition, while raised exterior stairs and French doors reflect the Creole influence of New Orleans. Town also took the climate of southern Louisiana into account while designing his homes, using large roof overhangs, an abundance of breezeways, and cross ventilation to provide air circulation. He designed the French Quarter Lamp produced by Andrew Bevolo.

Town's involvement in the selection of interior materials, colors, and even furnishings was extensive—sometimes going as far as to include the recommendation of a certain type of dog to accent the house. Town was one of the first architects to salvage old building materials and incorporate them into new houses, giving his homes a comfortable, elegant feel. He would often scrounge abandoned warehouses and rice mills for floorboards, fireplace mantels, or flagstones, handpicking the individual elements that would eventually be incorporated into his architecture.

Legacy
For more than 65 years, Town built houses and buildings throughout south Louisiana and the southern United States, garnering numerous national awards. Moreover, he maintained personal relationships with his many clients, people of all ages who became his friends and delighted in his company until his death in 2005 at the age of 101. Town is best remembered for his distinctive style, which adapted to modern use the traditional elements of classic Louisiana, including full-length shutters, dovecotes, 13-foot ceilings, plantation-style separate shutters and brick floors with a special beeswax finish. As of 2010, many of those houses built and designed by Town bear a plaque from the Foundation for Historical Louisiana identifying it as an “original Hays Town.”

Works
Capitol High School in Baton Rouge

References

Additional sources
 Louisiana Houses of A. Hays Town by A. Hays Town, Cyril E. Vetter, and Philip Gould. Louisiana State University Press, 1999. 
 The Architectural Style of A. Hays Town by A. Hays Town (Hardcover - Dec 1985)
 The Life and Work of the Twentieth-Century Louisiana Architect A. Hays Town (Mellen Studies in Architecture, V. 10) (Hardcover) by David H. Sachs (Author)
 The Southeastern Architectural Archive, Special Collections Division, Tulane University Librariess.

External links 
 
 
 
 "What You Get for $3 million", "Great Homes and Destinations", The New York Times, August 22, 2012 (featuring one of A. Hays Town's houses).

Architects from Louisiana
American residential architects
University of Louisiana at Lafayette alumni
Tulane School of Architecture alumni
1903 births
2005 deaths
American centenarians
Men centenarians